The second season of the TBS sitcom Men at Work premiered on April 4, 2013 and concluded on June 6, 2013. A total of ten episodes aired. Season two regular cast members include Danny Masterson, Michael Cassidy, Adam Busch, Meredith Hagner and James Lesure.

Cast
 Danny Masterson as Milo Foster
 Michael Cassidy as Tyler Mitchell
 Adam Busch as Neal Bradford
 James Lesure as Gibbs
 Meredith Hagner as Amy Jordan

Recurring
 J. K. Simmons as P.J. Jordan
 Peri Gilpin as Alex
 Sarah Wright as Molly
 Stephanie Lemelin as Rachel
 Joel David Moore as Doug

Production
TBS has renewed Men at Work for a 10 episode second season, which premiered on April 4, 2013. Upcoming guest stars for season two include, Peri Gilpin as Alex, the new boss at Full Steam magazine; Sarah Wright as Molly, a girl Milo meets through Missed Connections; Stephanie Lemelin as Rachel; Marsha Thomason as a beautiful British chef; Mark-Paul Gosselaar as Tim, Amy's successful ex-boyfriend; Jessica Szohr as Jenny, Amy's beautiful friend; Seth Green as homeless man; Bethany Joy Lenz as Meg, a single mother who Tyler takes an interest in; Benjamin McKenzie as Meg's ex-husband; Maz Jobrani as the owner of a Lebanese chicken restaurant who befriends Gibbs; Kevin Corrigan as Darryl, a hard rock-loving, chicken wing-eating moonshiner who ends up sitting next to Milo at a wedding reception, and Jason Lee as Donny, an annoying co-worker dubbed a "story troller" by the guys. J. K. Simmons and Joel David Moore return as P.J. Jordan and Doug respectively, whilst John Michael Higgins guests as Lindsey Tucker, P.J's magazine nemesis.

Episodes

References

External links 

2013 American television seasons